José Eucebio Mallqui Beas is a Peruvian politician. He served as Congressman representing Ancash for the 2006–2011 term, and belonged to the National Unity party. He is also the president of the football (soccer) team Sport Ancash.

References

External links
 Official site

Living people
National Unity (Peru) politicians
Members of the Congress of the Republic of Peru
Year of birth missing (living people)

Christian People's Party (Peru) politicians